Schorgast is a river of Bavaria, Germany. It flows into the White Main east of Kulmbach.

See also
List of rivers of Bavaria

References

Rivers of Bavaria
Kulmbach (district)
Rivers of Germany